Comedienne is a 1923 Soviet silent romantic drama directed by Aleksandr Ivanovsky.

The film's sets were designed by the art director Vladimir Ballyuzek.

Cast
 Kondrat Yakovlev 
 Pyotr Andriyevsky 
 Nina Shaternikova as Lyuba 
 Sergei Shishko 
 Yelena Tumanskaya 
 Yekaterina Korchagina-Aleksandrovskaya 
 Aleksandr Panteleyev
 Aleksandr Novikov as Lakey  
 Alexander Shiryaev as Skripochkin

References

Bibliography 
 Paul Babitsky & John Rimberg. The Soviet Film Industry. 1955.

External links 
 

1923 films
1923 romantic drama films
Soviet silent films
1920s Russian-language films
Films directed by Aleksandr Ivanovsky
Soviet black-and-white films
Soviet romantic drama films
Silent romantic drama films